The Chinese Elm cultivar Ulmus parvifolia 'Ohio' was raised by A. M. Townsend at the USDA National Arboretum, and released in 1992.

Description
'Ohio' is a moderately vase-shaped tree growing to approximately 13 m in height, the crown much the same in diameter but appears much looser and more open than most varieties. The small leaves are grass-green in colour, turning a dull red in autumn. The samarae too are reddish in colour.

Pests and diseases
The species and its cultivars are highly resistant, but not immune, to Dutch elm disease, and unaffected by the elm-leaf beetle (Xanthogaleruca luteola).

Cultivation
Initially marketed by Princeton Nurseries, near Kingston, New Jersey (but not listed 2007), the tree is not known to be in cultivation beyond North America.

Accessions

North America
 United States National Arboretum, Washington, D.C., US.

References

External links
 http://www.ces.ncsu.edu/depts/hort/consumer/factsheets/trees-new/cultivars/ulmus_parvifolia.htm Ulmus parvifolia cultivar list.

Chinese elm cultivar
Ulmus
Ulmus articles missing images